Montafia is a comune (municipality) in the Province of Asti in the Italian region Piedmont, located about  southeast of Turin and about  northwest of Asti.

Montafia borders the following municipalities: Buttigliera d'Asti, Capriglio, Cortazzone, Piea, Piovà Massaia, Roatto, San Paolo Solbrito, Viale, and Villanova d'Asti.

Demographic evolution

References

Cities and towns in Piedmont